Colorado Ambush is a 1951 American Western film directed by Lewis D. Collins and produced by Vincent M. Fennelly. It stars Johnny Mack Brown, Lois Hall, and Myron Healey, who also wrote the screenplay for the film.

Cast
Johnny Mack Brown as Johnny Mack Brown
Lois Hall as Janet Williams
Myron Healey as Chet Murdock
Tommy Farrell as Terry Williams
Christine McIntyre as Mae Star
Lee Roberts as Henchman Gus
Marshall Bradford as Ben Williams
Lyle Talbot as Sheriff Ed Lowery

References

External links

1951 Western (genre) films
American Western (genre) films
Films directed by Lewis D. Collins
Monogram Pictures films
American black-and-white films
1950s English-language films
1950s American films